Tesla: Man Out of Time is a 1981 biography of Nikola Tesla by Margaret Cheney. The book describes the life of Nikola Tesla (1856–1943), the Serbian-American inventor. Margaret Cheney's narrative details Tesla's childhood during the 1850s and 1860s in the then Austro-Hungarian Empire, his 1884 arrival in New York, becoming an American citizen in 1891, his inventions and contributions to engineering, up to his death New York at age 86 during the middle of World War II in 1943. The book is focused largely on Tesla's personality and not his inventions.

External links
Worldcat entry, 1981 Prentice Hall 1st ed.
Simon & Schuster website, 2001 ed.

1981 non-fiction books
Books about Nikola Tesla